Alap Aman Momin (born 25 June 1974), professionally known as Alap Momin and Oktopus is an American musician, composer and producer. He is a former member of Dälek and MRC Riddims.

Career
Alap Aman Momin was born to Indian parents and grew up in New Jersey. From a young age, Momin developed an interest in music and took up playing guitar at the age of 12 and began to join local bands. Gradually his interest shifted to engineering and he started his first recording studio in 1993 in his parents' basement in Parsippany, New Jersey.

Dälek

In 1995, while at William Patterson University, Alap met Will Brooks and Joshua Booth. The three started collaborating as experimental hip hop group Dälek. The group has been described as hip-hop revolutionaries. Dälek released seven albums and embarked on a number of tours.

In 2010, Alap left Dälek and moved to Berlin, where he lived for two years. Momin began work on a solo project entitled BKGD Audio as well as Third Culture Kings, a collaboration with Jan Johanson from Glorybox.

Momin has engineered and produced: Jon Spencer Blues Explosion, The Black Hollies, Miss TK and The Revenge, Lifetime, Dälek, The Dillinger Escape Plan, Rye Coalition, All Natural Lemon and Lime Flavors, Charles Hayward (This Heat), Faust, Jets To Brazil, Yael Naem, Will Oldham, David Byrne, Yann Tiersen, Alan Vega and Mark Mulcahy.

MRC Riddims 
MRC Riddims is the DJ/production team of Alap Now and Merc Anthony. In 2009 Alap began collaborating with longtime friend Merc, who was a member of the shoegaze band All Natural Lemon and Lime Flavors. The two began exploring a sound that sought to fuse Jamaican Dancehall and House music.

BKGD Audio 
In April 2016 Alap released his first solo record "Round One" as BKGD Audio on NY label Internet and Weed. It was followed by his second album "Sufi Service" in 2021 also on Internet & Weed. Apart from that he released several singles and also remixes as BKGD Audio in the meantime.

Discography

BKGD Audio 
 Fluid City EP (2016)
 Round One (2016)
 Juakali - Believe That (2016)
 Anda - Talkin 2 Myself (2016)
 Nunta de Valoare Remixes (2016)
 Good Fellas Remixes (2016)
 Sweat Equity Hot New Tracks Comp (2015)
 Schwarz - Forever/Body Emotion Remixes (2015)

MRC Riddims 
 Medvede Vedia Volume 1 Comp (2014)
 Ghostigital - The AntiMatter Boutique Remixes (2013)
 You Know How/Internet And Weed 7" (2013)
 "Feel Me" 7" (2013)
 MRC Riddims/Karaoke Tundra - split 12" (2013)
 Picore - Assyrian Vertigo Remixes (2011)

Film, television and videogame composer
 Sundance Film Festival Bumper - (2016)
 Welcome To Showside - Ian McGinty (2015)
 Sundance Film Festival Bumper - (2015)
 Sundance Next Fest Bumper - (2014)
 Sundance Next Weekend Festival Bumper - (2013)
 Flipbook Fighters - iPad/iPhone - (2013)
 Lilith - Sridhar Reddy (2011)
 Ferrari Challenge - Wii - (2009)
 Choke - Clark Gregg (2008)
 The Guitar - Amy Redford (2008)

Producer and engineer

Further reading 
 Jakubiak
 Parallel Planes, a documentary film

References

American hip hop musicians
1974 births
Living people
American musicians of Indian descent